Eldar Moldozhunusov (born 15 September 1995) is a Kyrgyz professional footballer who plays as a forward for I-League club Gokulam Kerala and the Kyrgyzstan national team.

Club career
In January 2023, Moldozhunusov moved to India, signing with I-League defending champions Gokulam Kerala on a season-long deal.

Career statistics

International

Statistics accurate as of match played 29 March 2022

International goals
Scores and results list Kyrgyzstan's goal tally first.

Honours
Neftchi Kochkor-Ata
Kyrgyzstan Cup: 2019

References

External links

1995 births
Living people
Kyrgyzstani footballers
Kyrgyzstan international footballers
Association football forwards
FC Alay players
Gokulam Kerala FC players
Kyrgyzstani expatriate footballers
Expatriate footballers in India
Kyrgyzstani expatriate sportspeople in India